Gora is a rural locality (a village) in Andreyevskoye Rural Settlement, Vashkinsky District, Vologda Oblast, Russia. The population was 2 as of 2002.

Geography 
The distance to Lipin Bor is 63 km, to Andreyevskaya is 32 km. Afanasyevskaya is the nearest rural locality.

References 

Rural localities in Vashkinsky District